Chip and Dale Towers are two  tall sandstone towers located in the Island in the Sky District of Canyonlands National Park, in San Juan County, Utah. Chip and Dale Towers are an eroded fin composed of hard, fine-grained Wingate Sandstone, which is the remains of wind-borne sand dunes deposited approximately 200 million years ago in the Late Triassic. This Wingate Sandstone overlays a softer layer of the Chinle Formation. Access to the towers is via the four-wheel drive White Rim Road, and a scramble to reach the base. The top of the towers rise over 1,000 feet above the road in approximately one-half mile. Precipitation runoff from Chip and Dale Towers drains east to the nearby Colorado River.

Climbing
The first ascent of 240-foot Chip Tower was made in October 1993 by Jeff Widen and Jeff Singer via Stuffin Nuts, (III, A2) on the south face. The first ascent of 330-foot Dale Tower was made October 2, 1994, by Jeff Widen, Cameron Burns, and Jeff Singer, via Boy's Night Out, (III, 5.9, Al, 3 pitches). The National Park Service temporarily closes access to these climbing routes to protect wildlife habitat for lambing desert bighorn sheep and nesting raptors season (March through August).

Climate
According to the Köppen climate classification system, the towers are located in a Cold semi-arid climate zone, which is defined by the coldest month having an average mean temperature below  and at least 50% of the total annual precipitation being received during the spring and summer.

See also
 Colorado Plateau
 Geology of the Canyonlands area

References

External links
 Canyonlands National Park National Park Service
 Chip and Dale Towers weather forecast: National Weather Service
 Chip Tower Rock Climbing: Mountainproject.com

Landforms of San Juan County, Utah
Colorado Plateau
Canyonlands National Park
Sandstone formations of the United States